Howard Glacier is a small alpine glacier just west of Crescent Glacier, flowing into Taylor Valley on the north from the Kukri Hills, in Victoria Land, Antarctica. The glacier was studied in December 1957 by U.S. geologist T.L. Pewe, who named it for Arthur D. Howard, a geomorphologist of Stanford University who was a glaciologist in Antarctica during U.S. Navy Operation Highjump, 1946–47.

References

Glaciers of McMurdo Dry Valleys